The Yamaha XV125 is a cruiser motorcycle built by the Yamaha Motor Company, which was produced from 1997 to 2004. The XV 125 Virago is, apart from the 125cc-smaller displacement, identical to the larger sister model Yamaha XV250 Virago.

The Virago 125 is equipped with an air-cooled two-cylinder four-stroke engine, which initially developed a power of 7.3 kW / 10 hp (1997) and later developed a power of 8.3 kW / 11.4 hp (1998-2002). Power is transmitted to the road through a five-speed chain drive.

References

Virago 125
Cruiser motorcycles
Motorcycles introduced in 1997